Gerard Mark Joseph Boyarsky (born May 15, 1959) is a former American football player who was a defensive tackle who played for four teams in the National Football League, including the New Orleans Saints, the Cincinnati Bengals, the Buffalo Bills, and the Green Bay Packers.  He played college football at the University of Pittsburgh. Jerry Boyarsky graduated from Lakeland School District, Pennsylvania

References

1959 births
American football defensive tackles
Players of American football from Pennsylvania
Living people
New Orleans Saints players
Cincinnati Bengals players
Buffalo Bills players
Green Bay Packers players
Pittsburgh Panthers football players
Sportspeople from Scranton, Pennsylvania